K. P. Sankaran is a Malayalam–language literary critic from Kerala, India. Born on 15 May 1939 in Painkulam in Trichur district of the erstwhile Kingdom of Cochin (now part of India), he was a teacher at Changanacherry S.B. College, Trichur Kerala Varma College and Mysore Regional Institute of Education from where he retired in 2001. He resides with his wife Kamala Devi in Kottapparambu near Chelavoor, Calicut since 2019. He has authored around 30 books.

Works
 Sameepanam (1970). Calicut: Poorna Publications
 Rithuparivarthanam (1972). Calicut: Poorna Publications
 Navakam (1988). Calicut: Poorna Publications
 Anuseelanam (2002). Trichur: Current Books
 Abhivadhyam (2005). Trichur: Kerala Sahitya Akademi
 Thriveni (2005). Trichur: Current Books
 Sapthakam (2009). Trichur: Kerala Sahitya Akademi
 C. S. Nair: Nammude Sahitya Vimarshanathinte Sukranakshatram (2013). Sukapuram: Vallathol Vidyapeetham
 Mattoru Vailoppilly (2015). Sukapuram: Vallathol Vidyapeetham
 Akkithaperuma (2022). Sukapuram: Vallathol Vidyapeetham
 Kavitha Hridayam
 Gandhi Kavithakal: Pathanam
 Adhyatma Ramayanam: Samshodhanam, Vyakhyanam
 Hari Nama Keerthanam: Vyakhyanam
 Mahabharatam: Oru Punarvayana
 Jnanappana: Vyakhyanam

Awards
 2004: Kerala Sahitya Akademi Award for Literary Criticism (Anuseelanam)
 2008: Deviprasadam Trust Award
 2012: Kerala Sahitya Akademi Award for Overall Contributions
 2017: Cherukad Award
 2019: S. Guptan Nair Award
 2019: Vyloppilli Jayanthi Award
 2021: Kerala Sahitya Akademi Fellowship
 K. P. Narayana Pisharody Award
 Dr. C. P. Menon Memorial Award

References

1939 births
Living people
Malayalam-language writers
Recipients of the Kerala Sahitya Akademi Award
People from Thrissur district
Writers from Kerala
Malayalam literary critics
Indian literary critics